Boscean is a hamlet on the Penwith peninsula in west Cornwall, England, United Kingdom, approximately half-a-mile northwest of St Just.

References

Hamlets in Cornwall
Penwith